Dejan Petrovic may refer to:

 Dejan Petrović (born 1978), Australian-born Serbian tennis player and coach
 Dejan Petrovič (born 1998), Slovenian football player